Marmara apocynella is a moth of the family Gracillariidae. It is known from Ohio and Maine in the United States.

The larvae feed on Apocynum cannabinum. They mine the stem of their host plant. The mine has the form of a long whitish serpentine mine on the stem.

References

Marmarinae
Moths described in 1915